The economy of Russia  has gradually transformed from a planned economy into a mixed market-oriented economy. It has enormous natural resources, particularly oil and natural gas. It is the world's ninth-largest economy by nominal GDP, and the sixth-largest by PPP. Russia's membership to the WTO was accepted in 2011.

Russia's vast geography is an important determinant of its economic activity, with the country holding a large share of the world's natural resources. It has been widely described as an energy superpower; as it has the world's largest natural gas reserves, the second-largest coal reserves, the eighth-largest oil reserves, and the largest oil shale reserves in Europe. It is the world's leading natural gas exporter, the second-largest natural gas producer, and the second-largest oil exporter, and producer. Russia's foreign exchange reserves are the world's fourth-largest. It has a labour force of roughly 70 million people, which is the world's sixth-largest. Russia is the world's second-largest exporter of arms. Russia also has the world's fifth-largest number of billionaires.

The oil and gas sector accounted up to roughly 40% of Russia's federal budget revenues, and up to 60% of its exports in 2019. In 2019, the Natural Resources and Environment Ministry estimated the value of natural resources to 60% of the country's GDP. Russia has one of the lowest external debts among major economies, although its inequality of household income and wealth remains comparatively high. Following the Russian invasion of Ukraine in 2022, the country has faced several sanctions and boycotts from the Western world and its allies, a move described as an "all-out economic and financial war" to isolate the Russian economy from the Western financial system. In spite of economic sanctions, Russia's economy remains quite resilient.

History 

The Russian economy is volatile. Since 1989 its institutional environment was transformed from a socialist command economy to a capitalistic market system. Its industrial structure dramatically shifted away from heavy investment in manufacturing and agriculture toward market services, oil, gas, and mining. Richard Connolly argues that for the last four centuries, there are four main characteristics of the Russian economy that have shaped the system and persisted despite the political upheavals. First of all the weakness of the legal system means that impartial courts do not rule and contracts are problematic. Second is the underdevelopment of modern economic activities, with very basic peasant agriculture dominant into the 1930s. Third is technological underdevelopment, eased somewhat by borrowing from the West in the 1920s. And fourth lower living standards compared to Western Europe and North America.

Russian Empire

Soviet Union 

Beginning in 1928, the course of the Soviet Union's economy was guided by a series of five-year plans. By the 1950s, the Soviet Union had rapidly evolved from a mainly agrarian society into a major industrial power. 
By the 1970s the Soviet Union was in an Era of Stagnation. The complex demands of the modern economy and inflexible administration overwhelmed and constrained the central planners. The volume of decisions facing planners in Moscow became overwhelming. The cumbersome procedures for bureaucratic administration foreclosed the free communication and flexible response required at the enterprise level for dealing with worker alienation, innovation, customers, and suppliers.

From 1975 to 1985, corruption and data fiddling became common practice among bureaucracy to report satisfied targets and quotas thus entrenching the crisis. Starting in 1986, Mikhail Gorbachev attempted to address economic problems by moving towards a market-oriented socialist economy. Gorbachev's policies of Perestroika failed to rejuvenate the Soviet economy; instead, a process of political and economic disintegration culminated in the breakup of the Soviet Union in 1991.

Transition to market economy (1991–98)

Following the collapse of the Soviet Union, Russia underwent a radical transformation, moving from a centrally planned economy to a globally integrated market economy. Corrupt and haphazard privatization processes turned over major state-owned firms to politically connected "oligarchs", which has left equity ownership highly concentrated.

Yeltsin's program of radical, market-oriented reform came to be known as a "shock therapy". It was based on the policies associated with the Washington Consensus, recommendations of the IMF and a group of top American economists, including Larry Summers who in 1994 urged for "the three '-ations'—privatization, stabilization, and liberalization" to be "completed as soon as possible." With deep corruption afflicting the process, the result was disastrous, with real GDP falling by more than 40% by 1999, hyperinflation which wiped out personal savings, crime and destitution spreading rapidly. The jump in prices from shock therapy wiped out the modest savings accumulated by Russians under socialism and resulted in a regressive redistribution of wealth in favour of elites who owned non-monetary assets.

Shock therapy was accompanied by a drop in the standard of living, including surging economic inequality and poverty, along with increased excess mortality and a decline in life expectancy. Russia suffered the largest peacetime rise in mortality ever experienced by an industrialized country. Likewise, the consumption of meat decreased: in 1990, an average citizen of the RSFSR consumed 63 kg of meat a year; by 1999, it had decreased to 45 kg.

The majority of state enterprises were privatized amid great controversy and subsequently came to be owned by insiders for far less than they were worth. For example, the director of a factory during the Soviet regime would often become the owner of the same enterprise. Under the government's cover, outrageous financial manipulations were performed that enriched a narrow group of individuals at key positions of business and government. Many of them promptly invested their newfound wealth abroad, producing an enormous capital flight.  This rapid privatization of public assets, and the widespread corruption associated with it, became widely known throughout Russia as "prikhvatizatisiya," or "grab-itization."

Difficulties in collecting government revenues amid the collapsing economy and dependence on short-term borrowing to finance budget deficits led to the 1998 Russian financial crisis.

In the 1990s Russia was "the largest borrower" from the International Monetary Fund, with loans totalling $20 billion. The IMF was criticised for lending so much, as Russia introduced little of the reforms promised for the money and a large part of these funds could have been "diverted from their intended purpose and included in the flows of capital that left the country illegally".

Recovery and growth (1999–2008)

Russia bounced back quickly from the August 1998 financial crash, partly because of a devaluation of the rouble, which made domestic producers more competitive nationally and internationally.

Between 2000 and 2002, significant pro-growth economic reforms included a comprehensive tax reform, which introduced a flat income tax of 13%; and a broad effort at deregulation which benefited small and medium-sized enterprises.

Between 2000 and 2008, Russian economy got a major boost from rising commodity prices. GDP grew on average 7% per year. Disposable incomes more than doubled and in dollar-denominated terms increased eightfold. The volume of consumer credit between 2000 and 2006 increased 45 times, fuelling a boom in private consumption. The number of people living below poverty line declined from 30% in 2000 to 14% in 2008.

Inflation remained a problem however, as the central bank aggressively expanded money supply to combat appreciation of the rouble. Nevertheless, in 2007 the World Bank declared that the Russian economy achieved "unprecedented macroeconomic stability". Until October 2007, Russia maintained impressive fiscal discipline with budget surpluses every year from 2000.

2009–14

Russian banks were hit by the global credit crunch in 2008, though no long term damage was done thanks to proactive and timely response by the government and central bank, which shielded the banking system from effects of the global financial crisis. A sharp, but brief recession in Russia was followed by a strong recovery beginning in late 2009.

Between 2000 and 2012 Russia's energy exports fuelled a rapid growth in living standards, with real disposable income rising by 160%. In dollar-denominated terms this amounted to a more than sevenfold increase in disposable incomes since 2000. In the same period, unemployment and poverty more than halved and Russians' self-assessed life satisfaction also rose significantly. This growth was a combined result of the 2000s commodities boom, high oil prices, as well as prudent economic and fiscal policies. However, these gains have been distributed unevenly, as the 110 wealthiest individuals were found in a report by Credit Suisse to own 35% of all financial assets held by Russian households. Russia also has the second-largest volume of illicit money outflows, having lost over $880 billion between 2002 and 2011 in this way. Since 2008 Forbes has  repeatedly named Moscow the "billionaire capital of the world".

After eighteen years of negotiations, Russia's membership to the WTO was accepted in 2011. In 2013, Russia was labelled a high-income economy by the World Bank.

Russian leaders repeatedly spoke of the need to diversify the economy away from its dependence on oil and gas and foster a high-technology sector. In 2012 oil, gas and petroleum products accounted for over 70% of total exports. This economic model appeared to show its limits, when after years of strong performance, the Russian economy expanded by a mere 1.3% in 2013. Several reasons were proposed to explain the slowdown, including a prolonged recession in the EU, which is Russia's largest trading partner, stagnant oil prices, lack of spare industrial capacity and demographic problems. Political turmoil in neighbouring Ukraine added to the uncertainty and suppressed investment.

2014–21

Following the annexation of Crimea in March 2014 and Russia's involvement in the ongoing War in Donbas, the United States, the European Union, Canada and Japan imposed sanctions on Russia. This led to the decline of the Russian rouble and sparked fears of a Russian financial crisis. Russia responded with sanctions against a number of countries, including a one-year period of total ban on food imports from the European Union and the United States.

According to the Russian economic ministry in July 2014, GDP growth in the first half of 2014 was 1%. The ministry projected growth of 0.5% for 2014. The Russian economy grew by a better than expected 0.6% in 2014. Russia is rated one of the most unequal of the world's major economies.

As of 2015, real income was still lower for 99% of Russians than it was in 1991.
 
The Russian economy risked going into recession from early 2014, mainly due to falling oil prices, sanctions, and the subsequent capital flight. While in 2014 GDP growth remained positive at 0.6%, in 2015 the Russian economy shrunk by 3.7% and was expected to shrink further in 2016. By 2016, the Russian economy rebounded with 0.3% GDP growth and officially exited recession. The growth continued in 2017, with an increase of 1.5%.

In January 2016, Bloomberg rated Russia's economy as the 12th most innovative in the world, up from 14th in January 2015 and 18th in January 2014. Russia has the world's 15th highest patent application rate, the 8th highest concentration of high-tech public companies, such as internet and aerospace and the third highest graduation rate of scientists and engineers.

In 2019 Russia's Natural Resources and Environment Ministry estimated the value of natural resources to $844 billion or 60% of the country's GDP.

2022–present 

In 2022, there have been heavy sanctions due to the Russian invasion of Ukraine that will likely result in steep recession. Since early 2022 many official economic statistics are not published. Sanctions also included asset freezes on the Russian Central Bank, which holds $630 billion in foreign-exchange reserves, to prevent it from offsetting the impact of sanctions.

According to most estimates, every day of the war in Ukraine costs Russia $500 million to $1 billion.

On 27 June 2022 Russia defaulted on part of its foreign currency, its first such default since 1918.

In November 2022 it was reported that Russia had officially entered a recession as the Federal State Statistics Service had reported a national GDP loss for the second consecutive quarter.

As part of the sanctions imposed on Russia, on 2 September 2022, the finance ministers of the G7 group agreed to cap the price of Russian oil and petroleum products, designed to allow Russia to maintain production but limiting the revenue from oil sales.

Data 
The following table shows the main economic indicators in 1980–2021 (with IMF staff estimates in 2022–2026). Inflation below 5% is in green.

Public policy

Fiscal policy

Russia was expected to have a Government Budget deficit of $21 billion in 2016.  The budget deficit narrowed to 0.6% of GDP in 2017 from 2.8% in 2016.

National wealth fund and debt 
On 1 January 2004, the Government of Russia established the Stabilization fund of the Russian Federation as part of the federal budget to balance it if price of oil falls. On 1 February 2008 the Stabilization fund was divided into two parts. The first is a reserve fund equal to 10% of GDP (10% of GDP equals to about $200 billion now), and was to be invested in a similar way as the Stabilization Fund. The second is the National Prosperity Fund of the Russian Federation. Deputy Finance Minister Sergei Storchak estimated it would reach 600–700 billion roubles by 1 February 2008. The National Prosperity Fund is to be invested in more risky instruments, including the shares of foreign companies.

Russia has one of the lowest foreign debts among major economies.

Corruption

Russia was the lowest rated European country in Transparency International's Corruption Perceptions Index for 2020; ranking 129th out of 180 countries. Corruption is perceived as a significant problem in Russia, impacting various aspects of life, including the economy, business, public administration, law enforcement, healthcare, and education. The phenomenon of corruption is strongly established in the historical model of public governance in Russia and attributed to general weakness of rule of law in Russia. As of 2020, the percentage of business owners who distrust law enforcement agencies rose to 70% (from 45% in 2017); 75% don't believe in impartiality of courts and 79% do not believe that legal institutions protect them from abuse of law such as racketeering or arrest on dubious grounds.

Sectors

Primary

Energy

The mineral-packed Ural Mountains and the vast fossil fuel (oil, gas, coal), and timber reserves of Siberia and the Russian Far East make Russia rich in natural resources, which dominate Russian exports. Oil and gas exports, specifically, continue to be the main source of hard currency.

Russia has been widely described as an energy superpower; as it has the world's largest natural gas reserves, the second-largest coal reserves, the eighth-largest oil reserves, and the largest oil shale reserves in Europe. It is the world's leading natural gas exporter, the second-largest natural gas producer, and the second-largest oil exporter, and producer. Fossil fuels cause most of the greenhouse gas emissions by Russia. The country is the world's fourth-largest electricity producer, and the ninth-largest renewable energy producer in 2019. Russia was also the world's first country to develop civilian nuclear power, and to construct the world's first nuclear power plant. In 2019, It was the world's fourth-largest nuclear energy producer.

Mining

Russia is also a leading producer and exporter of minerals and gold. Russia is the largest diamond-producing nation in the world, estimated to produce over 33 million carats in 2013, or 25% of global output valued at over $3.4 billion, with state-owned ALROSA accounting for approximately 95% of all Russian production.

In 2019, the country was the 3rd world producer of gold; 2nd worldwide producer of platinum; 4th worldwide producer of silver; 9th largest world producer of copper; 3rd largest world producer of nickel; 6th largest world producer of lead; 9th largest world producer of bauxite; 10th largest world producer of zinc; 2nd worldwide producer of vanadium; 2nd largest world producer of cobalt; 5th largest world producer of iron ore; 7th largest world producer of boron; 9th largest world producer of molybdenum; 13th largest world producer of tin; 3rd largest world producer of sulfur; 4th largest world producer of phosphate; 8th largest world producer of gypsum; in addition to being the world's 10th largest producer of salt. It was the world's 6th largest producer of uranium in 2018.

Agriculture

Russia's agriculture sector contributes about 5% of the country's total GDP, although the sector employs about one-eighth of the total labour force. However, due to the harshness of its environment, about 13.1% of its land is agricultural, and only 7.4% of its land is arable. The main product of Russian farming has always been grain, which occupies considerably more than half of the cropland. Russia is the world's largest exporter of wheat, and is the largest producer of barley, buckwheat, oats, and rye, and the second-largest producer of sunflower seed. Various analysts of climate change adaptation foresee large opportunities for Russian agriculture during the rest of the 21st century as arability increases in Siberia, which would lead to both internal and external migration to the region.

More than one-third of the sown area is devoted to fodder crops, and the remaining farmland is devoted to industrial crops, vegetables, and fruits. Owing to its large coastline along three oceans, Russia maintains one of the world's largest fishing fleets, ranking sixth in the world in tonnage of fish caught; capturing 4,773,413 tons of fish in 2018. It is also home to the world's finest caviar (the beluga), and produces about one-third of all canned fish, and some one-fourth of the world's total fresh and frozen fish.

Industry

Defence industry

The defence industry of Russia is a strategically important sector and a large employer in the country. Russia has a large and sophisticated arms industry, capable of designing and manufacturing high-tech military equipment, including a fifth-generation fighter jet, nuclear powered submarines, firearms, and short range/long range ballistic missiles. It is the world's second-largest exporter of arms, behind only the United States.

Aerospace

Aircraft manufacturing is an important industry sector in Russia, employing around 355,300 people. The Russian aircraft industry offers a portfolio of internationally competitive military aircraft such as MiG-29 and Su-30, while new projects such as the Sukhoi Superjet 100 are hoped to revive the fortunes of the civilian aircraft segment. In 2009, companies belonging to the United Aircraft Corporation delivered 95 new fixed-wing aircraft to its customers, including 15 civilian models. In addition, the industry produced over 141 helicopters. It is one of the most science-intensive hi-tech sectors and employs the largest number of skilled personnel. The production and value of the military aircraft branch far outstrips other defence industry sectors, and aircraft products make up more than half of the country's arms exports.

The Space industry of Russia consists of over 100 companies and employs 250,000 people.

Automotive industry

Automotive production is a significant industry in Russia, directly employing around 600,000 people or 1% of the country's total workforce. Russia produced 1,767,674 vehicles in 2018, ranking 13th among car-producing nations in 2018, and accounting for 1.8% of the worldwide production. The main local brands are light vehicle producers AvtoVAZ and GAZ, while KamAZ is the leading heavy vehicle producer. Eleven foreign carmakers have production operations or are constructing their plants in Russia.

Electronics
Russia is experiencing a regrowth of microelectronics, with the revival of JCS Mikron.

Services

Retail
As of 2013, Russians spent 60% of their pre-tax income on shopping, the highest percentage in Europe. This is possible because many Russians pay no rent or house payments, owning their own home after privatization of state-owned Soviet housing. Shopping malls were popular with international investors and shoppers from the emerging middle class. Eighty-two malls had been built near major cities including a few that were very large. A supermarket selling groceries is a typical anchor store in a Russian mall.

Retail sales in Russia

Telecommunications

Russia's telecommunications industry is growing in size and maturity. As of December 2007, there were an estimated 4,900,000 broadband lines in Russia.

In 2006, there were more than 300 BWA operator networks, accounting for 5% of market share, with dial-up accounting for 30%, and Broadband Fixed Access accounting for the remaining 65%. In December 2006, Tom Phillips, chief government and regulatory affairs officer of the GSM Association stated:
"Russia has already achieved more than 100% mobile penetration thanks to the huge popularity of wireless communications among Russians and the government's good work in fostering a market driven mobile sector based on strong competition."

The financial crisis, which had already hit the country at the end of 2008, caused a sharp reduction of the investments by the business sectors and a notable reduction of IT budget made by government in 2008–2009. As a consequence, in 2009 the IT market in Russia declined by more than 20% in rouble terms and by one-third in euro terms. Among the particular segments, the biggest share of the Russian IT market still belongs to hardware.

Key data on the telecommunications market in Russia

Transportation

Railway transport in Russia is mostly under the control of the state-run Russian Railways. The total length of common-used railway tracks is the world's third-longest, and exceeds . , Russia has 1,452.2 thousand km of roads, and its road density is among the world's lowest. Russia's inland waterways are the world's second-longest, and total . Among Russia's 1,218 airports, the busiest is Sheremetyevo International Airport in Moscow.

Russia's largest post is the Port of Novorossiysk in Krasnodar Krai along the Black Sea. It is the world's sole country to operate nuclear-powered icebreakers, which advance the economic exploitation of the Arctic continental shelf of Russia, and the development of sea trade through the Northern Sea Route.

Construction

In 2009 the Russian construction industry survived its most difficult year in more than a decade. The 0.8% reduction recorded by the industry for the first three quarters of 2010 looked remarkably healthy in comparison with the 18.4% slump recorded the previous year, and construction firms became much more optimistic about the future than in previous months. The most successful construction firms concluded contracts worth billions of dollars and planned to take on employees and purchase new building machinery. The downturn served to emphasise the importance of the government to the construction market.

Insurance
According to the Central Bank of Russia 422 insurance companies operate on the Russian insurance market by the end of 2013. The concentration of insurance business is significant across all major segments except , as the top 10 companies in 2013 charged 58.1% premiums in total without compulsory health insurance (CHI). Russian insurance market in 2013 demonstrated quite significant rate of growth in operations. Total amount of premiums charged (without CHI) in 2013 is RUB 904.9 bln (increase on 11.8% compared to 2012), total amount of claims paid is RUB 420.8 bln (increase on 13.9% compared to 2012). Premiums to GDP ratio (total without CHI) in 2013 increased to 1.36% compared to 1.31 a year before. The share of premiums in household spending increased to 1.39%. Level of claims paid on the market total without CHI is 46.5%, an insufficient increase compared to 2012. The number of policies in 2013 increased on 0.1% compared to 2012, to 139.6 mln policies.

Although relative indicators of the Russian insurance market returned to pre-crisis levels, the progress is achieved mainly by the increase of life insurance and accident insurance, the input of these two market segments in premium growth in 2013 largely exceeds their share on the market. As before, life insurance and accident insurance are often used by banks as an appendix to a credit contract protecting creditors from the risk of credit default in case of borrower's death or disability. The rise of these lines is connected, evidently, with the increase in consumer loans, as the total sum of credit obligations of population in 2013 increased by 28% to RUB 9.9 trillion. At the same time premium to GDP ratio net of life and accident insurance remained at the same level of 1.1% as in 2012. Thus, if "banking" lines of business are excluded, Russian insurance market is in stagnation stage for the last four years, as premiums to GDP ratio net of life and accident insurance remains at the same level of 1.1% since 2010.

Information technology

The IT market is one of the most dynamic sectors of the Russian economy. Russian software exports have risen from just $120 million in 2000 to $3.3 billion in 2010. Since the year 2000 the IT market has started growth rates of 30–40% a year, growing by 54% in 2006 alone. The biggest sector in terms of revenue is system and network integration, which accounts for 28.3% of the total market revenues. Meanwhile, the fastest growing segment of the IT market is offshore programming.

The government has launched a program promoting construction of IT-oriented technology parks (Technoparks)—special zones that have an established infrastructure and enjoy a favorable tax and customs regime, in seven different places around the country: Moscow, Novosibirsk, Nizhny Novgorod, Kaluga, Tumen, Republic of Tatarstan and St. Peterburg Regions.

Under a government decree signed in June 2013, a special "roadmap" is expected to ease business suppliers’ access to the procurement programs of state-owned infrastructure monopolies, including such large ones as Gazprom, Rosneft, Russian Railways, Rosatom, and Transneft. These companies will be expected to increase the proportion of domestic technology solutions they use in their operations. The decree puts special emphasis on purchases of innovation products and technologies. According to the new decree, by 2015, government-connected companies must double their purchases of Russian technology solutions compared to the 2013 level and their purchasing levels must quadruple by 2018.

Russia is one of the few countries in the world with a home grown internet search engine who owns a relevant marketshare as the Russian-based search engine Yandex is used by 53.8% of internet users in the country.

Known Russian IT companies are ABBYY (FineReader OCR system and Lingvo dictionaries), Kaspersky Lab (Kaspersky Anti-Virus, Kaspersky Internet Security), Mail.Ru (portal, search engine, mail service, Mail.ru Agent messenger, ICQ, Odnoklassniki social network, online media sources).

Tourism

According to a UNWTO report, Russia is the sixteenth-most visited country in the world, and the tenth-most visited country in Europe, as of 2018, with 24.6 million visits. Russia is ranked 39th in the Travel and Tourism Competitiveness Report 2019. According to Federal Agency for Tourism, the number of inbound trips of foreign citizens to Russia amounted to 24.4 million in 2019. Russia's international tourism receipts in 2018 amounted to $11.6 billion. In 2020, tourism accounted for about 4% of country's GDP. Major tourist routes in Russia include a journey around the Golden Ring theme route of ancient cities, cruises on the big rivers like the Volga, and journeys on the famous Trans-Siberian Railway. Russia's most visited and popular landmarks include Red Square, the Peterhof Palace, the Kazan Kremlin, the Trinity Lavra of St. Sergius and Lake Baikal.

External trade and investment

Trade
Russia recorded a trade surplus of US$15.8 billion in 2013. Balance of trade in Russia is reported by the Central Bank of Russia. Historically, from 1997 until 2013, Russia balance of trade averaged US$8338.23 million reaching an all-time high of US$20647 million in December 2011 and a record low of −185 USD million in February 1998. Russia runs regular trade surpluses primarily due to exports of commodities.

In 2015, Russia main exports are oil and natural gas (62.8% of total exports), ores and metals (5.9%), chemical products (5.8%), machinery and transport equipment (5.4%) and food (4.7%). Others include: agricultural raw materials (2.2%) and textiles (0.2%).

Russia imports food, ground transports, pharmaceuticals and textile and footwear. Main trading partners are: China (7% of total exports and 10% of imports), Germany (7% of exports and 8% of imports) and Italy. This page includes a chart with historical data for Russia balance of trade. Exports in Russia decreased to US$39038 million in January 2013 from US$48568 million in December 2012. Exports in Russia is reported by the Central Bank of Russia. Historically, from 1994 until 2013, Russia Exports averaged US$18668.83 million reaching an all-time high of US$51338 million in December 2011 and a record low of US$4087 million in January 1994. Russia is the 16th largest export economy in the world (2016) and is a leading exporter of oil and natural gas. In Russia, services are the biggest sector of the economy and account for 58% of GDP. Within services the most important segments are: wholesale and retail trade, repair of motor vehicles, motorcycles and personal and household goods (17% of total GDP); public administration, health and education (12%); real estate (9%) and transport storage and communications (7%). Industry contributes 40% to total output. Mining (11% of GDP), manufacturing (13%) and construction (4%) are the most important industry segments. Agriculture accounts for the remaining 2%. This page includes a chart with historical data for Russia Exports. Imports in Russia decreased to US$21296 million in January 2013 from US$31436 million in December 2012. Imports in Russia is reported by the Central Bank of Russia. Historically, from 1994 until 2013, Russia imports averaged US$11392.06 million reaching an all-time high of US$31553 million in October 2012 and a record low of US$2691 million in January 1999. Russia main imports are food (13% of total imports) and ground transports (12%). Others include: pharmaceuticals, textile and footwear, plastics and optical instruments. Main import partners are China (10% of total imports) and Germany (8%). Others include: Italy, France, Japan and United States. This page includes a chart with historical data for Russia Imports.

Foreign trade of Russia – Russian export and import

Foreign trade rose 34% to $151.5 billion in the first half of 2005, mainly due to the increase in oil and gas prices which now form 64% of all exports by value. Trade with CIS countries is up 13.2% to $23.3 billion. Trade with the EU forms 52.9%, with the CIS 15.4%, Eurasian Economic Community 7.8% and Asia-Pacific Economic Community 15.9%.

Mergers and acquisitions 
Between 1985 and 2018 almost 28,500 mergers or acquisitions have been announced in Russia. This cumulates to an overall value of around 984 bil. USD which translates to 5.456 bil. RUB. In terms of value, 2007 has been the most active year with 158 bil. USD, whereas the number of deals peaked in 2010 with 3,684 (964 compared to the value record year 2007). Since 2010 value and numbers have decreased constantly and another wave of M&A is expected.

The majority of deals in, into or out of Russia have taken place in the financial sector (29%), followed by banks (8.6%), oil and gas (7.8%) and Metals and Mining (7.2%).

Here is a list of the top deals with Russian companies participating ranked by deal value in mil. USD:

The majority of the top 10 deals are within the Russian Oil and Gas sector, followed by Metals and Mining.

See also

 Commonwealth of Independent States
 History of post-Soviet Russia
 List of companies of Russia
 List of Russian federal districts by GDP
 Monotown, a town whose economy is dominated by a single industry or company. The term is sometimes used regarding some towns in Russia
 Politics of Russia
 Taxation in Russia
 Types of legal entities in Russia
 Unitary enterprise, a government-owned corporation in Russia and some other post-Soviet states
 List of federal subjects of Russia by GDP per capita
 List of Russian federal subjects by GRP

References

Further reading
 Alexeev, Michael, and Shlomo Weber, eds. The Oxford handbook of the Russian economy (Oxford UP, 2013)  excerpt.
 Åslund, Anders. Russia's Crony Capitalism: The Path from Market Economy to Kleptocracy (Yale University Press, 2019). excerpt
 Connolly, Richard. The Russian economy: a very short introduction (2020)  excerpt
 
 Gustafson, Thane. Wheel of Fortune: The Battle for Oil and Power in Russia (Harvard UP, 2012). excerpt
 Meyers, William Henry, Schmitz, Andrew, eds. Transition to agricultural market economies: the future of Kazakhstan, Russia, and Ukraine (2015)
 Miller, Chris. Putinomics: Power and money in resurgent Russia (UNC Press Books, 2018). excerpt
 Moser, Nat. Oil and the Economy of Russia: From the Late-Tsarist to the Post-Soviet Period (2017)
 Novokmet, Filip Thomas Piketty, and Gabriel Zucman (2017). From Soviets to Oligarchs: Inequality and Property in Russia 1905–2016
 Zinchenko, L. A., et al. "Main features of the Russian economy and its development." International Journal of Applied Business and Economic Research 15.23 (2017): 265–272.

External links

 
Ministry of Finance of the Russian Federation 
Ministry of Economic Development (Russia) 
World Bank Summary Trade Statistics Russia 
Russia profile at the CIA World Factbook
Russia profile at The World Bank

 
Russia
Russia